Charles H. Cushman (May 25, 1850 – June 29, 1909) was an American baseball umpire and manager in the late nineteenth century.

For parts of three seasons (and ), Cushman umpired National League baseball games. He umpired 110 total games.

He led the Brewers to 21 wins, with 15 losses in 36 games in 1891.

Umpiring career
In May 1884, following a Fort Wayne-St. Paul game, Cushman was struck in the head with a rock thrown by an eleven-year-old boy.

In 1898, Cushman umpired in the National League until July. Initial rumors were that Cushman was having problems with league president Nicholas Young. Later, Cushman said that he was discharged after refusing to swear to an affidavit incriminating Cap Anson and another former manager on violations of the Brush Act. He joined the staff of the Western League late in the season.

See also
List of managers of defunct Major League Baseball teams

References

External links
Baseball-Reference manager page

1850 births
1909 deaths
Sportspeople from New York City
Major League Baseball umpires
Minor league baseball managers